May 22 San'a is a football club playing in Yemen. 22 May Stadium is their home field; it has a capacity of 27,000.

Football clubs in Yemen